Paulo Victor may refer to:

 Paulo Victor (footballer, born 1987), born Paulo Victor Mileo Vidotti, Brazilian football goalkeeper
 Paulo Victor (footballer, born 1994), born Paulo Victor Costa Soares, Brazilian football forward
 Paulo Victor (footballer, born 1996), born Paulo Victor Rodrigues de Souza, Brazilian football midfielder
 Paulo Victor (footballer, born 1998), born Paulo Victor Dias de Andrade, Brazilian football midfielder
 Paulo Victor (footballer, born 2001), born Paulo Victor de Almeida Barbosa, Brazilian football left-back

See also
 Paulo Vitor (disambiguation)
 Paul Victor (footballer) (born 1984), Dominica football defender